The Wells Fargo Championship is a professional golf tournament in North Carolina on the PGA Tour. Held in early May at the Quail Hollow Club in Charlotte (except in 2022, when it was played at TPC Potomac at Avenel Farm), it has attracted some of the top players on the tour. It debuted in 2003 as the Wachovia Championship and was known in 2009 and 2010 as the Quail Hollow Championship.  In 2017, the tournament offered a $7.5 million purse with a winner's share of $1.35 million.

From 2004–06 and 2011–13, the tournament ended in a playoff.  Additionally, the event has one of the tougher finishes on tour with 16, 17, and 18, commonly known as the "Green Mile," often ranked among the PGA Tour's toughest holes.  Organized by Champions for Education, Inc., the majority of the charitable proceeds from the tournament benefit Teach for America.

In 2017, the tournament was held on the coast in Wilmington at Eagle Point Golf Club, as Quail Hollow hosted the PGA Championship in mid-August. Wilmington hosted the Azalea Open on tour in the 1950s and 1960s at the Donald Ross-designed Cape Fear Country Club; it was a tune-up event for The Masters through 1965, part of the city's Azalea Festival.

In 2022, the tournament will be held near Washington, D.C. at TPC Potomac at Avenel Farm in Potomac, Maryland, as Quail Hollow is scheduled to host the Presidents Cup in late September.

Decades earlier, Quail Hollow hosted the PGA Tour's Kemper Open eleven times, from 1969 through 1979.

Sponsorship
The event is sponsored by Wells Fargo, which purchased Wachovia in 2008.  In 2009, Wells Fargo dropped the Wachovia name from the tournament for marketing purposes as they intended to stop using the Wachovia name for all purposes. In addition, Wells Fargo was concerned about the image of a bank sponsoring a sporting event that had received Federal funding under the Troubled Assets Relief Program. After two editions as the Quail Hollow Championship, Wells Fargo attached its name to the event in 2011.

On April 30, 2019, a five-year extension was announced, and Wells Fargo's sponsorship of the tournament currently runs through 2024.

Tournament hosts

Winners

Note: Green highlight indicates scoring records.
Sources:

Multiple winners
3 wins
Rory McIlroy: 2010, 2015, 2021

2 wins
Max Homa: 2019, 2022

References

External links

Coverage on the PGA Tour's official site

 

PGA Tour events
Golf in North Carolina
Golf in Maryland
Sports competitions in Charlotte, North Carolina